The Nations Cup 1967-68 was the eight edition of a European rugby union championship for national teams, and third with the formula and the name of "Nations Cup". The tournament was won by France.

First division 
Table (Italy withdraw)

Results

Division 2

Pool 1 
Table

Poland admitted to final

Results

Pool 2 

Table

Marocco admitted to final

Results

Final 

 Poland promoted in first division

Bibliography 
 Francesco Volpe, Valerio Vecchiarelli (2000), 2000 Italia in Meta, Storia della nazionale italiana di rugby dagli albori al Sei Nazioni, GS Editore (2000) .
 Francesco Volpe, Paolo Pacitti (Author), Rugby 2000, GTE Gruppo Editorale (1999).

References

External links
 FIRA-AER official website

1967–68 in European rugby union
1967–68
1967 rugby union tournaments for national teams
1968 rugby union tournaments for national teams